Fabio Silberberg (born 25 March 1969) is a former professional tennis player from Brazil.

Biography
Born in São Paulo, Silberberg was a left-handed player, with a one handed backhand. He learned his early tennis at the city's Paulistano Club and had his best year as a junior in 1987 when he finished 17th in the world rankings for singles. In doubles he made the boy's quarter-finals of the 1987 French Open with Alberto Mancini and ended the year at 10 in the world.

Before turning professional in 1991 he competed at the University of Tennessee for three seasons, while studying for a sports management degree.

Silberberg played in the main draw at two ATP Tour tournaments, the Brasília Open and São Paulo Open, both in 1991. He had a first round exit in each, but made the second round of the doubles at Brasilia, with John Stimpson. 

He won a Challenger title at Whistler in 1991 and in the same year won a match against Guillermo Vilas at a São Paulo Challenger tournament. Further Challenger titles came in the doubles at Cali in 1992 and the singles at the 1994 Belo Horizonte Challenger. 

In 1995 he played in a Davis Cup tie for Brazil, against Mexico on hard courts at the German Club in Mexico City. His win over Óscar Ortiz in the reverse singles was the only match Brazil won in the tie.

He retired from professional tennis in 1996 and now runs "Faberg Tour Experience", a São Paulo based travel company he founded in 2005.

ATP Challenger and ITF Futures finals

Singles: 2 (2–0)

Doubles: 3 (1–2)

See also
List of Brazil Davis Cup team representatives

References

External links
 
 
 

1969 births
Living people
Brazilian male tennis players
Tennis players from São Paulo
Tennessee Volunteers men's tennis players
20th-century Brazilian people
21st-century Brazilian people